CFGL-FM (105.7 MHz) is a commercial radio station serving Greater Montreal, airing a French Soft Adult Contemporary radio format. It is the flagship of the Rythme FM network, which operates across much of Quebec. The station is licensed to the off-Island suburb of Laval.

Owned and operated by Cogeco, it broadcasts with an effective radiated power (ERP) of 41,000 watts as a Class C1 station, using an omnidirectional antenna atop Mount Royal, at 297 metres (974') in height above average terrain (HAAT). Studios and offices are on Boulevard Saint-Martin Est in Laval.

History
CFGL was founded in September 1968 by Jean-Pierre Coallier and Roland Saucier. It originally was powered at 100,000 watts but from a tower in Laval only 400 feet in height. It began as a French-language beautiful music station serving Laval and the suburbs north of Montreal. In the 1980s, the audience for the easy listening format began aging, so CFGL began adding more vocals in an effort to attract younger listeners. It made the full transition to French soft adult contemporary music in 1992.

In 1999, it switched to a French mainstream  adult contemporary sound, known as Rythme FM. The move proved to be quite successful. CFGL became the top-rated French-language radio station in North America. It held that distinction until its sister station, French talk outlet CHMP-FM, overtook it in Fall 2011.

On May 17, 2017, CFGL-FM began broadcasting in HD Radio, offering a digital radio simulcast of its FM feed on its digital sideband, with room for potential expansion of subchannels in the future.

By 2019, the station returned to soft adult contemporary.

Notable hosts
 Pierre Nadeau OC CQ, announcer circa 1979

References

External links
Official website 
 

Fgl
Fgl
Radio stations established in 1968
Laval, Quebec
FGL
Fgl
1968 establishments in Quebec